Avena is an unincorporated community in Avena and Sefton Townships, Fayette County, Illinois, United States.

References

Unincorporated communities in Fayette County, Illinois
Unincorporated communities in Illinois